Indra Hang Subba is an Indian politician. He was elected to the Lok Sabha, the lower house of the Parliament of India from Sikkim in the 2019 Indian general election as a member of the Sikkim Krantikari Morcha.

Education

Currently, he is a research scholar at Sikkim University pursuing his doctorate in Physics. He has completed his Master of Science.

Early life

He was born in a small village in West Sikkim within the Maneybong-Dentam constituency. He completed his schooling from the Hee Yangthang Senior secondary school and later studied at Sikkim University.

References

External links
Official biographical sketch in Parliament of India website 

India MPs 2019–present
Lok Sabha members from Sikkim
Living people
Sikkim Krantikari Morcha politicians
Year of birth missing (living people)
People from Gyalshing district
Limbu people